Mundilfari, or Saturn XXV, is a natural satellite of Saturn. It was discovered by Brett J. Gladman, et al. in 2000, and given the temporary designation S/2000 S 9.
Mundilfari is about 7 kilometres in diameter, and orbits Saturn at an average distance of 18,360 Mm in 928.806 days, at an inclination of 170° to the ecliptic (150° to Saturn's equator), in a retrograde direction and with an eccentricity of 0.198.

Mundilfari may have formed from debris knocked off Phoebe by large impacts at some point in the Solar System's history. With a spectral slope of −5.0%/100 , Mundilfari is the bluest of all the moons studied by Grav and Bauer (2007), slightly more so than Phoebe (−2.5%/100 nm) and about as blue as Erriapus (+5.1%/100 nm) is red. Its rotation period is  hours, the second-fastest among all the irregular moons studied by Cassini–Huygens, and it appears to be very elongated in shape.

It was named in August 2003 from Norse mythology, where Mundilfari is the father of the goddess Sól (Sun) and the god Mani (Moon).

References

 IAUC 7538: S/2000 S 7, S/2000 S 8, S/2000 S 9 December 7, 2000 (discovery)
 MPEC 2000-Y15: S/2000 S 1, S/2000 S 2, S/2000 S 7, S/2000 S 8, S/2000 S 9 December 19, 2000 (discovery and ephemeris)
 IAUC 8177: Satellites of Jupiter, Saturn, Uranus August 8, 2003 (naming the moon)

Norse group
Moons of Saturn
Irregular satellites
Discoveries by Brett J. Gladman
Astronomical objects discovered in 2000
Moons with a retrograde orbit